Alitet Nikolaevich Nemtushkin (Irkutsk Oblast, Siberia 12 November 1939 - 2006) was an Evenk-Russian poet known for writing in and about his native Evenki language. He has received wide recognition in and outside of Russia, and his work is used by UNESCO to cultivate attention to the problem of Language Endangerment He has published more than 31 books of poetry, most of them in Russian, but some in Evenki.

References

1939 births
2006 deaths
Writers from Irkutsk
Evenks
20th-century Russian poets
Russian people of indigenous Siberian descent
21st-century Russian poets
Russian male poets
Herzen University alumni